Michael or Mike Reid may refer to:

Sportsmen
Mike Reid (golfer) (born 1954), American golfer
Mike Reid (defensive back) (born 1970), American football player for the Philadelphia Eagles
Michael Reid (boxer) (born 1938), Irish Olympic boxer
Michael Reid (linebacker) (born 1964), American football linebacker
Michael Reid (rugby league), Australian, active in the 1980s

Actors
Michael Eric Reid, American child actor
Mike Reid (actor) (1940–2007), English comedian and actor, best known for his role as Frank Butcher in the BBC soap opera EastEnders

Others
Mike Reid (singer) (born 1947), singer, songwriter and composer, also retired American football player (early 1970s)
Michael Reid (evangelist) (born 1944), English Christian evangelist
Michael Reid (journalist) (born 1952), English journalist, writer and commentator on Latin American and Iberian affairs
Michael Reid (politician) (born 1954), American politician in Missouri
Mike Reid (chef), British chef and co-host of Australian cooking television series

See also
Mike Read (born 1947), broadcaster
Michael Read (born 1941), swimmer
Michael Reed (disambiguation)